The American Scholar is the quarterly literary magazine of the Phi Beta Kappa Society, established in 1932. The magazine has won fourteen National Magazine Awards from the American Society of Magazine Editors from 1999 to present, including awards for General Excellence (circulation <100,000). Additionally, the magazine has won four Utne Independent Press Awards from Utne Reader, most recently in 2011 in the category "Best Writing". 

The magazine is named for an oration by Ralph Waldo Emerson given before the society in 1837. According to its website, "the magazine aspires to Emerson’s ideals of independent thinking, self-knowledge, and a commitment to the affairs of the world as well as to books, history, and science." The American Scholar began publishing fiction in 2006, and "essays, articles, criticism, and poetry have been mainstays of the magazine for 75 years."

Editors
Since its inception in 1932, the magazine has had seven editors-in-chief (two of them on an interim basis):

William Allison Shimer (1932–43)
Marjorie Hope Nicolson (1943–44)*
Hiram Haydn (1944–73)
Peter Gay (1974)*
Joseph Epstein (1974–98)
Anne Fadiman (1998–2004)
Robert Wilson (2004–present)

*Interim editor

See also 
List of literary magazines

References

External links 
 

Literary magazines published in the United States
Quarterly magazines published in the United States
English-language magazines
Magazines established in 1932
Magazines published in Washington, D.C.